Robert Beehoe Radcliffe (14 August 1797 – 26 August 1832) was an English first-class cricketer who played for Cambridge University in the 1810s. He is recorded in one match in 1819, totalling 6 runs with a highest score of 6 and taking 2 wickets.

Radcliffe was educated at Eton College and King's College, Cambridge. After graduating he became a Church of England priest and was vicar of Ashby-de-la-Zouch, Leicestershire, from 1828 until his death.

References

Bibliography
 

English cricketers
English cricketers of 1787 to 1825
Cambridge University cricketers
1797 births
1832 deaths
People educated at Eton College
Alumni of King's College, Cambridge
19th-century English Anglican priests